Ratana Stephens  (born August 16, 1946) is a Canadian entrepreneur and philanthropist. She is co-founder of Nature's Path, a leading manufacturer of organic foods. She has received numerous acknowledgements for her philanthropy and leadership in business.

Biography 
Ratana Stephens (born Ratana Malla Bagga) was born in pre-partition India, where her family operated a confectionary business. The family fled Lahore during the 1947 partition, settling in the Uttar Pradesh region. She earned a Master of Arts degree in English Literature at a college affiliated with Agra University. After completing her degree, Ratana worked as a college lecturer. In March 1969, she met her future husband, Arran Stephens, through an arranged marriage.

Career 
Upon arriving in Vancouver, British Columbia, Canada, the Stephens’ operated Golden Lotus Natural Foods, a restaurant Arran had opened in 1967, and now regarded as the first vegetarian restaurant in Canada. The Stephens’ would go on to open several more successful vegetarian restaurants and a popular health food store.

In 1990, Arran opened Nature's Path, North America's first certified organic breakfast cereal production facility in Delta, British Columbia, while Ratana ran their popular Woodlands restaurant. In 1992 Ratana joined Arran at Nature's Path, eventually taking the position of co-CEO. Two of Ratana's four children, Jyoti and Arjan, hold positions of leadership at Nature's Path. Nature's Path has grown to become the largest exclusively organic breakfast food manufacturer in North America.

Stephens has served on the Boards of Directors of several prominent Canadian institutions, including the United Way, the BC Children's Hospital, and the Royal BC Museum. From 2009 to 2014, Ratana served on the Advisory Council for BC Children's Hospital Foundation's Night of Miracles South Asian Gala. Since 2018, she has served on the Faculty Advisory Board for the Food and Land Systems for University of British Columbia.

Awards 
In 2015, Ratana was voted one of Canada's Top 10 Female Entrepreneurs.

In 2015, Stephens was named one of B.C.’s 50 Most Influential Women.

In 2017, Ratana was named one of Canada's Top 150 Noteworthy British Columbians.

In 2020, she was recognized as an Influential Woman in Business by Business in Vancouver.

In early 2020, The University of Victoria (UVIC) announced that Ratana and Arran are to receive honorary doctorate degrees in education in June 2020, however, this has been delayed due to COVID-19.

In 2021, Ratana and Arran received the Order of British Columbia. They were among a select few individuals to receive this honor, and they are recognized as extraordinary individuals who made significant contributions to B.C.

The Stephens received the Canada Marketing Legends Award in 2021 from the American Marketing Association.

Ratana and Arran won the Sustainable Food Award from Ecovia Intelligence in 2021 for their contributions to building a sustainable food industry. The 2021 awards were hosted online due to the pandemic.

In 2021, Ratana and Arran received the Lifetime Achievement Award in the 7th Annual Drishti Awards for their outstanding efforts to contribute to a civil society.

References

External links

1946 births
Living people
20th-century Canadian businesswomen
20th-century Canadian businesspeople
21st-century Canadian businesswomen
21st-century Canadian businesspeople
Canadian women business executives
Indian emigrants to Canada
Members of the Order of British Columbia